Georgia Anderson is an Italian/American attorney and the owner of the Law Office of Georgia Anderson, based in Los Angeles, California.

Background
Anderson was born and brought up in La Spezia, Italy. She attended the Faculty of Jurisprudence at University of Pisa, where she received her law degree in 2004. Continuing her studies at Loyola Law School in the US, she earned her Master of Law in 2014 with her main focus being on personal injury.

Career
Anderson began her career as a Commodities Trading Advisor for Futures and Forex, a foreign exchange trading company based in Encino, California. During her time trading on Wall Street, Anderson authored and edited several regular market commentaries such as the "Technical Analysis for Day Trading of Forex and Futures". While still working as a commodities trade advisor, Anderson appeared in the May 2009 issue of Playboy, where she was featured in their new “‘Women of Wall Street’” edition.Continuing her career in law, Anderson was admitted to the California Bar in December 2017. Anderson mostly focuses her practice on Personal Injury, Medical Malpractice, and Family Law.

References

Living people
Year of birth missing (living people)
California lawyers
Loyola Law School alumni